The Bond Pirates Rugby Club is an Australian rugby union football club that competes in the Gold Coast and District Rugby Union competition. The club is based in Miami on  Queensland's Gold Coast.

History

The Bond Pirates are an amalgamation of two early GCDRU clubs, the Pirates and Bond University.  The original Bond University club was based on the same field as the current one, but relations with the university were never good, and a permanent club house and change rooms were never made available.  The Pirates were a loosely affiliated bunch of rugby enthusiasts with no fixed home ground who would often cobble together a team on a Saturday morning.  Eventually, the two clubs, realising that something had to change in order for each to survive, agreed to combine.  Initially the newly formed club remained at Bond University, but with tensions increasing over vehicle access, noise, ground and facility maintenance, and a raft of other issues, the decision was made to look for a new home.  Eventually a deal was struck with the Gold Coast City Council to take over a recently vacated club house at the back of the Miami tip, in the Pizzey Park sports complex.  That ground remains the home of the Bond Pirates to this day.  In the years since the amalgamation, the club has played in, and lost, three first grade grand finals.  1998, 2004 and 2015.  So despite winning several junior, colts and lower grade premierships, the elusive first grade flag has yet to be captured by the club.

Notable former players

 James Slipper
 Tai McIsaac
Sam Kaletta
John Clarke
Ben Daley
Sam Norton-Knight

See also

 Sports on the Gold Coast, Queensland
 Rugby union in Queensland
 List of Australian rugby union teams

References

External links

Rugby union teams in Queensland
Rugby clubs established in 1996
1996 establishments in Australia
Bond University
University and college rugby union clubs in Australia
Burleigh Heads, Queensland
Rugby union teams on the Gold Coast, Queensland